The 2013–14 Maritime Junior Hockey League season was the 47th season in league history. The season consisted of 52 games played by each MHL team.

Upon completion the Truro Bearcats won the Kent Cup, the league's playoff championship trophy against the Dieppe Commandos 4 games to 2.  The Kent Cup champion Truro Bearcats met the Inouk de Granby (QJAAAHL Champs), the Carleton Place Canadians (CCHL champs) and the Saint-Jérôme Panthers (host) in Saint-Jérôme, Quebec to determine the Eastern Canadian Fred Page Cup champion. At tournaments end the Carleton Place Canadians won the Fred Page Cup, the Bearcats finished 3rd.

The 2013-14 season was the first time in 5 seasons that Summerside or Woodstock did not won the Kent Cup.

Team Change  
The Metro Shipbuliders relocated from Dartmouth to Kentville and renamed the Valley Wildcats.

Regular Season Standings 
Final standings

Note: GP = Games played; W = Wins; L = Losses; OTL = Overtime losses; SL = Shootout losses; GF = Goals for; GA = Goals against; PTS = Points; X - Clinched Playoff spot; Y - Clinched Division; Z- Clinched first overall

2014 MHL Playoff bracket

Eastlink Division Mini Series
 *= If necessary

The Valley Wildcats (2-0) came into this series as the underdogs after being dominated by the Yarmouth Mariners in the regular season. In game one Valley had proved many people wrong by winning it and beating Yarmouth for the seasons second time. In game 2 Valley managed to edge the Mariners 3-2 in OT to advance to the Eastlink Division semi-finals.(4) Yarmouth Mariners   Vs. (5) Valley WildcatsQuarter-finals

 Eastlink Semi-final 1 (1)Truro Bearcats  vs. (5)Valley Wildcats

After the Valley Wildcats (2-4) stunned the Yarmouth Mariners in the mini-series they could not pull off a series victory against the Truro Bearcats. Valley was heavily out shout and out scored in this series. Truro managed to get a whopping 24 pucks past Valley in 4 games while Valley managed just 6. Truro ended up sweeping the series and advancing to the Eastlink Division finals.
  
 

 Eastlink Semi-final 2 (2)Pictou County Crushers  vs. (3) Amherst Ramblers
The Pictou County Crushers (4-3) managed to edge the Amherst Ramblers (3-4) in seven games in a home team advantage series. Pictou County luckily clinched home ice advantage in this series by finishing ahead of Amherst. The home team won all seven games of the best of seven set. Pictou County with the series victory moved on to the Eastlink Division finals. 
 

 Roger Meek Semi-final 1 (1)Miramichi Timberwolves  vs. (4) Summerside Western Capitals
 

 Roger Meek Semi-finals (2)Dieppe Commandos  vs. (3) Woodstock Slammers
 

Semi-finals

Roger Meek Final (1) Miramichi Timberwolves  vs. (2) Dieppe Commandos
 

 Eastlink Final (1) Truro Bearcats  vs. (2)Pictou County Crushers
 

Kent Cup final

Kent Cup final (1E) Truro Bearcats  vs. (2M) Dieppe Commandos

The Truro Bearcats(12-2) defeated the Dieppe Commandos (10-7) 4 games to 2 to win the 2014 Kent Cup. During the series the Bearcats showed to their home fans that they have come to play this season and to win, but the Commandos showed at home that they also were there to play and win. But after all was said and done the favored Bearcats emerged as league champions. The Bearcats will now advance to the Fred Page Cup for a chance to defend their cup and a chance to advance to the Royal Bank Cup for the second straight year.
 

Fred Page Cup Championship
Hosted by the St. Jerome Panthers in Saint-Jerome, Quebec

Fred Page Cup Tournament

Round robin
Key; x = Clinched championship round berth; y = Clinched first overall

Tie Breaker: Head-to-Head, then 3-way +/-.

Truro Bearcats Schedule & Results

Semi-final

AwardsAll Star TeamAllstar Goaltender - Clint Windsor - Miramichi TimberwolvesAllstar Forwards - Rankyn Campbell - Miramichi Timberwolves, Bryce Milson - Miramichi Timberwolves, Jake Wright - Woodstock SlammersAllstar Defense - Dan Poliziani - Truro Bearcats, Trey Lewis - Miramichi TimberwolvesIndividual AwardsPlayer of the Year - Rankyn Campbell – Miramichi TimberwolvesDefense of the Year - Trey Lewis – Miramichi TimberwolvesRookie of the Year - Blade Mann-Dixon – Valley WildcatsTop Scorer - Jake Wright – Woodstock SlammersTop Goal-tending Duo - Jacob Fancy and Chris Festarini – Truro BearcatsCommunity Leadership Award - Patrick Durgy – Campbellton TigersCharacter Award - Stephen MacInnis – Pictou County Crushers Playoff MVP - Dan Poliziani - Truro BearcatsCoach of the Year - Jeff LeBlanc - Dieppe CommandosGM of the Year - JF Damphousse - Dieppe CommandosMoe Bent Builders Award''' -

External links 
 Official website of the Maritime Junior Hockey League
 Official website of the Canadian Junior Hockey League

MHL
Maritime Junior Hockey League seasons